Bill Dean (born Patrick Anthony Connolly, 3 September 1921 – 20 April 2000) was a British actor who was born in Everton, Liverpool, Lancashire. He took his stage name in honour of Everton football legend William 'Dixie' Dean.

Biography 
Dean served in the Royal Air Force during the Second World War, seeing action in North Africa and Italy. He worked variously as a tram driver, pipe fitter, insurance agent, ship's steward, docker and local government officer, while also appearing as a stand-up comedian in Lancashire clubs and pubs, before making his breakthrough in Ken Loach's The Golden Vision. Other work with Loach followed, including a leading role in the film Family Life (1971).

Dean was most notable in his later years for playing miserly Harry Cross in the soap opera Brookside. He joined the soap in 1983, a year after its inception, and remained there for seven years before departing in 1990. He briefly returned to the series in 1999 for three episodes, when his character re-appeared in Brookside Close suffering from Alzheimer's disease and wrongly believing that he still lived there. He returned briefly in a cameo for the Brookside Video 'Friday the 13th'   having his lawn driven over.

The same character was the inspiration behind the 1980s group 'Jegsy Dodd and the sons of Harry Cross' who hailed from the Wirral.

He also made appearances in numerous other UK soaps and dramas including, When the Boat Comes In, The Sweeney, Minder, Juliet Bravo and Heartbeat, in which he appeared as Harry Capshaw, the ring leader of a group of badger baiters.

His stage work included roles in Trevor Griffiths' play Comedians at The Old Vic, and Howard Brenton's The Churchill Play with the Nottingham Playhouse and then the Royal Shakespeare Company.

Dean also appeared in the video for the single "Groovy Train" by Liverpool band The Farm. He also appeared in the films Kes, Scum, Nightwatch and Let Him Have It.

Filmography

Television

Film
Murder Ahoy! (1964) – Police Constable (uncredited)
Those Magnificent Men in their Flying Machines (1965) – German Mechanic (uncredited)
Kes (1969) – Fish and Chip Shop Man 
Gumshoe (1971) – Tommy 
Family Life (1971) – Mr. Baildon
The Best Pair of Legs in the Business (1973) – Bert
Night Watch (1973) – Inspector Walker
Flame (1975) – Club Owner (uncredited)
Scum (1979) – Duke
Rising Damp (1980) – Workman
The Mirror Crack'd (1980) – 1st Man in Village Hall (uncredited)
Slayground (1983) – Compére
Let Him Have It (1991) – Foreman of the Jury
Priest (1994) – Altar boy

Personal life 

Dean was married, and had three children: two sons, one daughter.

Having been ill for some time he suffered a heart attack and, on 20 April 2000, died at the Arrowe Park Hospital on the Wirral, aged 78.

References

External links

1921 births
2000 deaths
English male film actors
English male soap opera actors
Male actors from Liverpool
20th-century English male actors
Royal Air Force personnel of World War II